The Lilienthal Normalsegelapparat (German: "Normal soaring apparatus") is a glider designed by Otto Lilienthal in Germany in the late 19th century.  It is considered to be the first aeroplane to be serially  produced, examples being made between 1893 and 1896.

Nine examples are known to have been sold, the buyers including Nikolai Zhukovsky and William Randolph Hearst.  Three original "normal gliders" are preserved in museums in London, Moscow,  and Washington, and a fragment of one is preserved in Munich. A similar glider, the Sturmflügelapparat ("storm wing apparatus") is preserved in the Technisches Museum in Vienna.

Lilienthal's flights using this glider typically achieved a distance of  starting from the top of the launching mound  that he  had constructed. A bow frame or "Prellbügel" was used to reduce the impact in case of a crash. Later the Normalsegelapparat was developed into a biplane.

An authentic replica of the Normalsegelapparat made by the Otto Lilienthal Museum have been investigated by the German Aerospace Center in wind tunnel and flight tests. The results proved that the glider was stable in pitch and roll and can be flown safely at moderate altitudes.

Specifications (typical)

References

Bibliography

 Nitsch, Stephan. Vom Sprung zum Flug (From the jump to the flight). Berlin, Brandenburgisches Verlagshaus, 1991. . Modified second edition: Die Flugzeuge von Otto Lilienthal.  Technik - Dokumentation - Rekonstruktion. (The airplanes of Otto Lilienthal. Technique - Documentation - Reconstruction). Otto-Lilienthal-Museum Anklam, 2016. .

External links 
 Lilienthal Museum website
 The DLR Lilienthal glider project website

19th-century German experimental aircraft
Lilienthal aircraft
Glider aircraft
German inventions
Otto Lilienthal
1893 in transport
1893 in Germany
Vehicles introduced in 1893
Aircraft first flown in 1893
Monoplanes